Yan'an Ershilipu Airport was a dual-use military and public airport serving the city of Yan'an in Shaanxi Province, China. It was opened in 1980, replacing the former Yan'an Dongguan Airport which was built in January 1936. It was closed on 8 November 2018, when Yan'an Nanniwan Airport began operation and all flights were transferred to the new airport.

See also
List of airports in China
List of the busiest airports in China

References

Airports in Shaanxi
Airports established in 1980
1980 establishments in China
Yan'an
Chinese Air Force bases
2018 disestablishments in China
Defunct airports in China

Baota District